The Cannabis College is a non-profit information centre located in the centre of Amsterdam's historic Red Light District in The Netherlands. Opened in 1998, the info centre features displays of the many and varied uses for Cannabis sativa and industrial hemp, as well as the history of human interaction with the plant. Everything from hemp building materials and plastics to medical Cannabis and worldwide legislation is covered.

The basement of the building hosts an organic flowering Cannabis garden, cultivated by an expert grower and utilizing some of the most reliable strains and popular organic nutrients.

There is also a Cannabis College in Garberville, California.

See also
 Hemp for Victory (film)

References

http://www.greencultured.co/blog

External links
 
 
  Hennepfestival met serieuze ondertoon - Binnenland | Het laatste nieuws uit Nederland leest u op Telegraaf.nl [binnenland]
 Travel | Cannabis coffee shops under threat in Amsterdam... | Stuff.co.nz
 The Salt Lake Tribune - Archives 

1998 establishments in the Netherlands
Organizations established in 1998
Organisations based in Amsterdam
Culture in Amsterdam
Tourist attractions in Amsterdam
1998 in cannabis
Cannabis in the Netherlands